Rekava (Sinhala for "Line of Destiny") is a 1956 film based on village life and mythical beliefs in Sri Lanka (then Ceylon). It is the first Sinhala film fully shot in Ceylon and was film shot outdoors in the country. It was also the first Sri Lankan film that was free from Indian influence. Many Sinhala films in that time were remakes of South Indian films and were not adapted to the Sri Lankan context, even having unnatural dialog.

Rekava is Sri Lankan director Lester James Peries's first film and was Willie Blake's first time as cinematographer. The film was well-received internationally, having been shown at the 1957 Cannes Film Festival and was included in the main competition. 

It is still the only Sri Lankan film nominated for the Palme d'Or. Despite its critical acclaim, Rekava was not a commercial success in Sri Lanka due to its defiance of mainstream film tropes (i.e., boy-girl romance, fighting, comedy, and Hindi-language musicals). Since then, it has become one of the best-known Sinhala movies and is considered to mark the birth of a uniquely Sri Lankan cinema.

On 28 December 2006, the film was screened at Ceylon Theatre's Regal cinema at 5 pm to mark its premiere 50 years prior in the same theater on December 28, 1956.

Synopsis
The film starts with stilt-walker cum musician Miguel (Sesha Palihakkara) arriving in the village of Siriyala with a monkey that performs antics for the public. Two village thieves try to rob him and a young boy named Sena (Somapala Dharapriya) prevents the robbery. Miguel, who is also a palm reader, reads the boy's palm and predicts that Sena will become a famous healer and bring dignity to the village.

One day, when Sena and his friend Anula (Myrtle Fernando) are flying a kite, Anula suddenly loses her eyesight. The native doctor of the village is unable to restore Anula's sight but Sena touches her eyes, miraculously Anula begins to see. Sena develops a reputation as a boy with a magical touch.

Sena's father, a notorious money lender in the village, uses Sena's talent to earn money. His father organizes a healing campaign among the villagers. A rich landowner brings in his son for treatment, but the son dies which triggers public outrage against Sena. Even worse, the village suffers a severe drought. Later, peace and tranquility return to Siriyala with Sena's blessings.

Cast 
 Somapala Dharmapriya as Sena
 Myrtle Fernando as Anula
 D.R. Nanayakkara as Sooty
 Iranganie Serasinghe as Kathrina
 N. R. Dias as Podi Mahaththaya
 Winston Serasinghe as Kumatheris
 Shesha Palihakkara as Stilt Walker / Balloon Vendor
 Nona Subeida as Rosalin
 Romulus de Silva as Village Elder
 Mallika Pilapitiya as Premawathie
 Ananda Weerakoon as Nimal
 Mapa Gunaratne as Doctor M. P. Gunaratne
 J. B. L. Gunasekera as Kumatheris's friend
 E. Marshall Perera as Photographer
 Sunila Jayanthi as Dancer

Music
The songs of the film are even heard and praised today. The music and lyrics were composed by Sinhala musical pioneer Sunil Santha and Rev. Fr. Merciline Jayakody, respectively. The music director was B. S. Perera. Lyrics by Fr. Marcelline Jayakodi. Latha Walpola, Indrani Wijebandara, Sisira Senaratne and Ivor Dennis contributed vocals. Sisira Senaratne sang the main song "Olu Nelum Neliya Rangala".

References

External links
Rekava in Sri Lanka Cinema Database
National Film Corporation of Sri Lanka - Official Website

Official Website of Lester James Peries in association with Ministry of Cultural Affairs, Sri Lanka
 

1956 films
Films directed by Lester James Peries
Films set in Sri Lanka (1948–present)
Sri Lankan drama films
1956 drama films
Sri Lankan black-and-white films